Dorothy Buckland-Fuller  (21 January 1922 – 5 July 2019) was an Australian sociologist, peace and human rights activist, migrant community advocate and humanist.

Early life and education 
Buckland-Fuller was born Dorothea Dimitropoulou in 1922 in Port Said, Egypt to Greek parents. Having lived for some years in England she migrated with her husband to Sydney, Australia in 1961. She studied at the University of New South Wales, completing a BA in 1969, followed by a MA Qual (Honours equivalent) in Sociology in 1972.

Career 
In 1974 Buckland-Fuller founded the Australian Migrant Women's Association to provide networking opportunities for migrant women.

She was appointed one of seven commissioners appointed to the Ethnic Affairs Commission of New South Wales in May 1977.

Buckland-Fuller was president of the Women's International League for Peace and Freedom in 2002–2004.

With Robyn Williams, she was joint patron of the Humanist Society of New South Wales Inc.

Buckland-Fuller died on 5 July 2019.

Awards and recognition 
In the 1977 Queen's Birthday Honours Buckland-Fuller was made a Member of the British Empire (MBE) "in recognition of service to the community".

In 2001 she was made a life member of the Council of the Greek Orthodox Community of Sydney and New South Wales in recognition of her 40 years' service to the Greek community. In the same year she was chosen as one of the first group of women to be inducted to the Victorian Honour Roll of Women.

She was made a Member of the Order of Australia (AM) in the 2008 Queen's Birthday Honours for "service to the community as a contributor to a range of social justice, ethnic and migrant women's organisations and through raising awareness of issues affecting women from culturally and linguistically diverse backgrounds".

Works

Conference papers

References 

1922 births
2019 deaths
University of New South Wales alumni
Members of the Order of the British Empire
Members of the Order of Australia
Australian humanists
Australian sociologists
Australian women sociologists
Egyptian people of Greek descent
Egyptian emigrants to the United Kingdom
British emigrants to Australia
 Australian people of Greek descent
 English people of Greek descent